Events in the year 2023 in Suriname.

Incumbents 

 President: Chan Santokhi
 Vice President: Ronnie Brunswijk
 Speaker: Marinus Bee

Events 
Ongoing  COVID-19 pandemic in Suriname

Deaths  
15 January - Dilip Sardjoe, 73, businessman and politician.

References 

 
2020s in Suriname
Years of the 21st century in Suriname
Suriname
Suriname